Black Eagle (French: Aigle Noir or L'Aigle Noir) is a gay bar in Montreal, Quebec, Canada. It attracts "leather and jeans" clientele, and screens pornography. The venue has theme nights, "draws a devoted crowd of 20-40 something men", and caters to the bear and leather subcultures.

See also
 The Eagle (bar)

References

Bear (gay culture)
Gay culture in Canada
Leather bars and clubs
LGBT culture in Montreal
LGBT drinking establishments in Canada
Ville-Marie, Montreal